Fuyang (previously romanized as Fowyang) is a prefecture-level city in northwestern Anhui province, China. It is bordered by Henan province to the west and the cities of Bozhou to the northeast, Huainan to the southeast, and Lu'an to the south.

Its population was 8,200,264 inhabitants at the 2020 census whom 2,128,538 lived in the built-up (or metro) area made of 3 urban districts Yingzhou, Yingdong and Yingquan.

History

Early Ruyin

Starting with the Qin dynasty, the region now called Fuyang was called Ruyin. Ruyin was classified as part of the ancient province of Yuzhou. In the early Han Dynasty, Ruyin was ruled by Xiahou Ying (d. 172 BCE), who fought alongside Liu Bang against the latter’s archrival Xiang Yu in the Chu–Han Contention (206–202 BC), and helped Liu Bang establish the Han dynasty. Following the establishment of the Han dynasty, the title conferred upon Xiahou Ying was "Lord of Ruyin". The second Lord of Ruyin was Xiahou Ying's son, Xiahou Zao (d. 165 BCE), whose tomb was later rediscovered in Fuyang in 1977.

Shuanggudui

The site of the second Lord of Ruyin's tomb, called Shuanggudui, was rediscovered in 1977 when Fuyang's municipal airport was undergoing an expansion. Two tombs were found, although only one contained texts. Much like Mawangdui, important classical Chinese texts were found at Shuanggudui that shed new light on ancient Chinese culture and literature. Texts recorded on bamboo strips were found at Shuanggudui, including the Yijing, Classic of Poetry, Zhuangzi, Cang Jie Pian (primer), Classic for Physiognomizing Dogs, tables of historical annals, studies of myriad phenomena, a text on xingqi (circulating breath), and others.

Ouyang Xiu

Ouyang Xiu, one of famous Eight Masters of the Tang and Song, died in 1072 in present-day Fuyang, Anhui. His influence was so great, even opponents like Wang Anshi wrote moving tributes on his behalf. Wang referred to him as the greatest literary figure of his age.

Red Turban Rebellion

In the fourteenth century, Han Shantong sought to overthrow the ruling Mongol Yuan dynasty. Han styled himself as the "Great King of Light," claiming to be an incarnation of Maitreya Bodhisattva, and heir to the preceding Song dynasty. Han was a native of Yingzhou, where he began the main thrust of the Red Turban Rebellion in 1351, initially gaining the support of 3000 rebels, and later 10,000. After entering Shandong province, the Red Turban Army merged with other rebel movements, eventually leading indirectly to the founding of the Ming dynasty.

Great Leap Forward

According to Chinese government reports in the Fuyang Party History Research Office, between the years 1959 and 1961, 2.4 million people from Fuyang died from famine. Before the famines, in 1958, the population of Fuyang had been 8 million people. During this period, Zeng Xisheng, the provincial Party secretary of Anhui, pursued large water conservation projects that led to insufficient irrigation for local crops, leading to mass starvation. Local cadres, fearing repercussions from Zeng, underreported death rates in their regions, in some cases forcing the starving villagers to hide if there was an official inspection. When Vice Chairman Dong Biwu came to visit the Fuyang region, provincial leaders ordered all corpses to be removed from Dong's travel route, and for edema patients to be rounded up and kept out of sight.

According to Frank Dikötter, death rates in the Fuyang region were especially high, rivaling those in Cambodia under the Khmer Rouge. Dikötter has summarized some of the history of exceptional violence in rural Fuyang during the Great Leap Forward, carried out by local Party members:

In some cases the violence was directly related to starvation, as in one case in Funan county in 1959:

Since the 1980s there has been greater official Chinese recognition of the importance of policy mistakes in causing the disaster, and the Party has acknowledged that the disaster was caused mainly by gross mismanagement, using the expression, "Three parts natural disaster and seven parts man-made disaster."

Blood selling

In the 1990s, commercial blood selling schemes led to entire villages in Henan and Anhui being infected with the HIV virus. The government in Fuyang, which at that time was headed by Wang Huaizhong, encouraged rural villagers to sell blood as a way to supplement their income. The blood collectors would often draw too much blood, causing their feet to go numb, and sometimes people were even hung upside down against a wall to force blood to flow back into their arms.

As compensation for giving their blood, participants were given 50 yuan along with some food and drink. Many people engaged in this practice due to rural poverty and local corruption, which placed them under great economic stress. As one woman from Fuyang recalls:

In a 2004 epidemiological survey of Fuyang, it was found that at least three thousand farmers had contracted HIV due to the blood trade.

The Fuyang AIDS Orphan Salvation Association has done some relief work to help AIDS orphans in Fuyang. The 2006 short film, The Blood of Yingzhou District, documents the many challenges faced by AIDS orphans living in rural parts of Fuyang's Yingzhou district.

Wang Huaizhong, who promoted blood selling in Fuyang in the early 1990s, was later promoted to deputy governor of Anhui province. However, in 2001, he was arrested for taking bribes. He was later convicted of accepting bribes totaling 5.17 million yuan, and having 4.8 million yuan of unaccountable assets. After being taken into custody, Wang attempted to bribe investigators into dropping the investigation, and continued to seek bribes from private business owners. In response, the court sentenced him to death, stating, "His attitude was disgusting and he was severely punished in accordance with the law." In February 2004, just two months after his trial, Wang was executed by lethal injection.

Wang Huaizhong had previously pursued the construction of a large airport in Fuyang that was widely regarded as a boondoggle, costing 390 million yuan, but which served only 920 passengers in 2002.

Recent events

In 2004, there was a food scandal involving fake infant formula being sold in Fuyang. Chinese state media reported that 50–60 children in Fuyang died from the formula, with the children belonging mostly to poor rural families. Fuyang's mayor Liu Qingqiang was reprimanded by the Chinese Communist Party for failing to supervise food safety, while Vice Mayor Ma Mingyue was forced to resign. Subsequently, 55 brands of cheap infant formula were banned after it was discovered they had only traces of the required nutrients.

In early 2007, Chinese state media began reporting that in Yingquan District, a government building dubbed the "White House" was becoming controversial. The construction cost of the "White House" was reported to have reached 30 million yuan, nearly one third of the 100 million yuan annual fiscal income of the entire Yingquan district. Despite being popularly deemed the "White House", the building resembles the United States Capitol.

In 2008, it was widely reported that Zhang Zhi'an, the Communist Party chief of Yingquan District, nicknamed the "White House Party Chief," had been suspended from his office on June 5, 2008, along several other officials. They were under investigation for the death of Li Guofu, a businessman who acted as a whistleblower. In Beijing, Li Guofu had accused Zhang of corruption and abuse of power, and hoped that Yingquan District would reclaim the area as farmland. In August 2007, Li Guofu was arrested by the Yingquan government on corruption charges and imprisoned. Zhang interrogated Li, threatening his family, and extracted a confession from him. On March 13, 2008, just hours before he was scheduled to see a lawyer, Li Guofu was found hanged. Although his death was deemed a suicide, media reported that Li Guofu's body was bruised and his mouth was tightly shut, uncharacteristic of a suicide by hanging. On February 8, 2010, Zhang was found guilty of taking bribes, retaliation, and framing an innocent person, and was sentenced to death with a two-year reprieve.

In March 2008, an outbreak of hand, foot, and mouth disease began in Fuyang, leading to 25,000 infections, and 42 deaths, by May 13.

In 2017, 18 people died in a car pile-up on an expressway near Fuyang.

Climate
Fuyang features a monsoon-influenced humid subtropical climate (Köppen Cwa) with cool, damp winters and very hot and wet summers. Because the weather is perceived as frequently changing, a common saying among local people is that, "Fuyang has four seasons in spring."

Administration

The prefecture-level city of Fuyang administers eight county-level divisions, including three districts, one county-level city and four counties.

Yingzhou District
Yingdong District
Yingquan District
Jieshou City
Taihe County
Linquan County
Funan County
Yingshang County

Culture

Cuisine
The most notable local dish in Fuyang is Ge La Tiao, a spicy noodle dish made with thick noodles mixed with sesame sauce, coriander, garlic, chili oil, and other ingredients. Many people native to Fuyang enjoy this dish, but some people who come to Fuyang from other areas may dislike it and find it difficult to digest.

Other notable local dishes include:
 Taihe Yangrou Banmian: a very common noodle dish served in Fuyang. This dish includes wide, flat noodles, along with Chinese cabbage, lamb, and red chili peppers.
 Fen Ji: a chicken soup made with cellophane noodles, breaded chicken, quail eggs, dasheen powder, and other seasonings.
 Zhen Tou Mo: a type of large steamed bread, which is often compared in size and shape to a pillow.
 Tian San Juan Mo: a type of pancake wrapped in the shape of a cone, stuffed with bean sprouts, tofu, and other ingredients, with sauce on top.

The most common type of Chinese tea in Fuyang is Huangshan Maofeng, followed by other teas such as Lu'an Guapian, Keemun black tea (Qimen Hongcha), and Taiping Houkui. Teas from outside the region are also popular, such as Tieguanyin and Longjing.

Transportation

Automobile
The G36 Nanjing–Luoyang Expressway goes through Fuyang, and runs from Nanjing, Jiangsu to the east, to Luoyang, Henan to the west.

Rail
Fuyang has a large railway station, and is a railway transportation hub for Anhui province. The Shangqiu-Hefei-Hangzhou High-speed Rail was opened in 2019, which serve Fuyang through the new Fuyang West railway station.

Air
Flights to and from major cities in China are possible through Fuyang Xiguan Airport.

Education

The city of Fuyang includes the following institutions of higher learning:

 Fuyang Normal University
 Fuyang Vocational and Technical College
 Fuyang Vocational College of Science and Technology

Fuyang Normal University is the largest institution of higher learning in the city of Fuyang. The University has two campuses with over 21,000 students and over 1100 full-time teachers.

Notable people
 Guan Zhong (?−645 BC), Spring and Autumn period era politician and economist
 Lü Meng (178−219), Three Kingdoms era military general serving the Kingdom of Wu 
 Ni Sichong (1868–1924), Chinese general part of the Anhui clique until resigning in 1920 due to the disastrous defeat in the Zhili–Anhui War
 Dai Houying (1938 – 1996), Chinese woman novelist
 Xie Yi (1967), Chinese chemist
 Deng Linlin (1992), Chinese gymnast

Notes

External links

 Government website of Fuyang 
 Website of Fuyang Normal University
 Website of Fuyang Vocational and Technical College

 
Cities in Anhui